Kirkstall is an electoral ward of Leeds City Council in west Leeds, West Yorkshire, covering Burley, Hawksworth, Kirkstall and the south west corner of West Park. It contains three rail stations: Burley Park, Headingley and Kirkstall Forge.

Councillors since 1973 

 indicates seat up for re-election.
* indicates incumbent councillor.

Elections since 2010

May 2022

May 2021

May 2019

May 2018

May 2016

May 2015

May 2014

May 2012

May 2011

May 2010

See also
Listed buildings in Leeds (Kirkstall Ward)

Notes

References

Places in Leeds
Wards of Leeds